Leroy Garfield Phelps (April 27, 1892 in New York City – February 16, 1964 in Freeport, Long Island) was a cinematographer who filmed Frank Buck’s second movie, Wild Cargo.

Early career
Phelps was official photographer of Yale University from 1920 to 1932. A year later, he accompanied Frank Buck to India, Ceylon, Sumatra and Malaya, where he filmed Wild Cargo.

Work with Frank Buck
While making Wild Cargo, Phelps was nearly crippled by an infection he acquired after scratching himself on a poisonous renghus tree in the jungle. Buck and Phelps were almost trampled by a herd of stampeding water buffalo, and were spared only when the animals changed direction at the last moment. Phelps was cinematographer for some of the sequences in Buck's 1941 film Jungle Cavalcade.

Later career
Phelps joined the Armand Denis- Leila Roosevelt Expedition to Africa and the Far East, and was associate producer of Wheels Across Africa, Wheels Across India and Dangerous Journey.

South Seas Documentary
While acting as a civilian pool photographer for the atomic bomb tests at Bikini Atoll, Phelps made a documentary film of the inhabitants of Likiep Atoll, which was selected for preservation by the Library of Congress.

Death
Phelps died at his home in Freeport, Long Island. He is buried in Greenfield Cemetery, Hempstead, Long Island.

References

External links
Leroy G. Phelps on the Internet Movie Database 

1892 births
1964 deaths
American cinematographers
20th-century American photographers
Artists from New York City